Paradrillia fugata is a species of sea snail, a marine gastropod mollusk in the family Horaiclavidae, the turrids.

Description
The length of the shell attains 45 mm, its diameter 14 mm.

Distribution
This marine species occurs off East India, in the Andaman Sea and off Sri Lanka at bathyal depths (1271 m – 2569 m).

References

  Smith, E.A., 1895. Natural History Notes from H.M. Indian Marine Survey Steamer 'Investigator' , Commander C.F. Oldham, R.N.- Series 2. No. 19. Report upon some Mollusca dredged in the Bay of Bengal and the Arabian Sea during the season 1893–94.. Annals and Magazine of Natural History 6 16:1–19, plates 1, 2
 Subba Rao, N.V. (2003) Indian Seashells (Part 1) Polyplacophora and Gastropoda. Records of the Zoological Survey of India, Occasional Paper, 192, x + 416 pp., 96 pls. NIZT 682

External links
  Tucker, J.K. 2004 Catalog of recent and fossil turrids (Mollusca: Gastropoda). Zootaxa 682:1–1295.

fugata
Gastropods described in 1895